Aloe wanalensis  is a species of Aloe native to east Uganda.

References

wanalensis
Plants described in 2011
Flora of Uganda